The Síl Conairi (Sil Chonairi, Conaire) or "Seed of Conaire" were those Érainn septs of the legendary Clanna Dedad descended from the monarch Conaire Mór, son of Eterscél Mór, a descendant of Deda mac Sin, namely the Dál Riata, Múscraige, Corcu Duibne, and Corcu Baiscinn.

The Dál Riata, presumably settling in far northeastern Ulster in the prehistoric period, would famously go on to contribute to the founding of the Kingdom of Alba or Scotland and be responsible for the Gaelicisation of that country. The most celebrated Royal Family of Scotland, the House of Dunkeld, described themselves as the "seed of Conaire Mór" as late as the twelfth century. Conaire Mór is thus an ancestor of the modern British royal family through the House of Dunkeld. According to tradition, the last king in the 'direct' male line from the Clanna Dedad and Síl Conairi was Alexander III of Scotland (d. 19 March 1286).

Although an earlier, prehistoric Gaelic presence in Scotland has long been noted by scholars, two early Kings of the Picts suggested to be from the Dál Riata, and who may have been instrumental in the (further) Gaelicisation of Pictland, were Bridei IV of the Picts and his brother Nechtan mac Der-Ilei.

The remaining Síl Conairi would settle and/or remain in Munster, where, although retaining their distinctive identity, they would be overshadowed at first by their Corcu Loígde / Dáirine kinsmen, but later reject them in favour of the Eóganachta and be instrumental in the rise to power of that dynasty. The Múscraige became the chief vassals and facilitators for the Eóganachta and their mesne king was regarded as more or less equal in status to the three or four regional kings under the Cashel overlordship. A late and unexpected king of Munster from the Múscraige was Flaithbertach mac Inmainén (d. 944).

The Corcu Duibne are renowned for their ogham inscriptions, with over one third of all Irish inscriptions found in their region. Both they and the Corcu Baiscinn were renowned as sailors. The latter were eventually absorbed into the Kingdom of Thomond under the O'Brien dynasty.

The birth, life, and fall of Conaire Mór are recounted in the epic tale Togail Bruidne Dá Derga. Two distantly related tales of more interest to genealogists are De Síl Chonairi Móir and De Maccaib Conaire. In these he is confused with his descendant or double Conaire Cóem, father of Na Trí Coirpri "The Three Cairbres", namely Coirpre Músc, a quo the Múscraige and Corcu Duibne, Coirpre Baschaín, a quo the Corcu Baiscinn, and Coirpre Rígfhota (Riata), a quo the Dál Riata.

The Three Cairbres

See also
 Senchus fer n-Alban
 Kings of Tara

Notes

References

 John Bannerman, Studies in the History of Dalriada. Edinburgh: Scottish Academic Press. 1974
 Edel Bhreathnach (ed.), The Kingship and Landscape of Tara. Dublin: Four Courts Press for The Discovery Programme. 2005.
 Francis John Byrne, Irish Kings and High-Kings. Four Courts Press. 2nd revised edition, 2001.
 Hector Munro Chadwick, Early Scotland: the Picts, the Scots and the Welsh of southern Scotland. Cambridge University Press. 1949.
 Margaret E. Dobbs, Side-lights on the Táin age and other studies. Dundalk: WM. Tempest. 1917.
 Thomas Charles-Edwards, Early Christian Ireland. Cambridge University Press. 2000.
 Eoin MacNeill, "Early Irish Population Groups: their nomenclature, classification and chronology", in Proceedings of the Royal Irish Academy (C) 29 (1911): 59–114
 Eoin MacNeill. "Notes on Irish Ogham Inscriptions", in Proceedings of the Royal Irish Academy. 1909. pp. 329–70
 Kuno Meyer (ed.), "The Laud Genealogies and Tribal Histories", in Zeitschrift für celtische Philologie 8 (1912): 291–338.
 Michael A. O'Brien (ed.) with intro. by John V. Kelleher, Corpus genealogiarum Hiberniae. DIAS. 1976. / partial digital edition: Donnchadh Ó Corráin (ed.), Genealogies from Rawlinson B 502. University College Cork: Corpus of Electronic Texts. 1997.
 T. F. O'Rahilly, Early Irish History and Mythology. Dublin Institute for Advanced Studies. 1946.
 Julius Pokorny, "Beiträge zur ältesten Geschichte Irlands (3. Érainn, Dári(n)ne und die Iverni und Darini des Ptolomäus)", in Zeitschrift für celtische Philologie 12 (1918): 323–57.

Historical Celtic peoples
Érainn
Scottish monarchs
Scottish clans
Tribes of ancient Ireland